Fairfield Township is one of eighteen townships in Buena Vista County, Iowa, USA.  As of the 2000 census, its population was 951.

Geography
According to the USGS, it contains two cemeteries: Fairfield and Smith.

References

External links
 US-Counties.com
 City-Data.com

Townships in Buena Vista County, Iowa
Townships in Iowa